Matthew (Matt) d'Arcy (born Dublin, died about 1997) was an Irish Michelin star winning head chef during his spell in the kitchen of restaurant Park in the Park Hotel Kenmare. Later, in 1992, he opened "d'Arcy's Kenmare" in Kenmare.

Personal
D'Arcy was married to Aileen O'Brien and two sons. He met his wife in the Park Hotel Kenmare where they both were working as chefs. They married in 1988.

Awards
 Michelin star Park Hotel Kenmare. Years unknown, between 1983 and 1990.

References 

Irish chefs
Head chefs of Michelin starred restaurants
1990s deaths
Year of birth missing